Johann of Limburg, gt von Stirum (died before 1364), son of lord Dietrich II of Limburg Stirum and Bertrada of Götterswick. And a cousin   of Diederik II count of Limburg Hohenlimburg.

He married (1st) Uda von Ravensberg and (2nd) Margareta von Ahaus, and had four children:

 Dietrich III of Limburg, zu Styrum (fl. 1347/91);
 Johann, a canon at Mülheim an der Ruhr;
 Hermann (fl. 1385);
 Jutta, married to Eberhard von der Leyten.

Literature
 W. Gf v. Limburg Stirum, "Stamtafel der Graven van Limburg Stirum", 's Gravenhage 1878; (outdated) 
 Bleicher,W.[German] Monatsschrift des Vereins für Orts- und Heimatkunde Hohenlimburg “Geschichte der Grafschaft Limburg”. Hohenlimburger Heimatblätter.Jhrg.1993-2013.

References 

House of Berg
14th-century deaths
Year of birth unknown